Asirgarh Road railway station is a small railway station in Burhanpur district, Madhya Pradesh. Its code is AGQ. The station consists of two platforms. The platforms are not well sheltered. It lacks many facilities including water and sanitation.

References

Railway stations in Burhanpur district
Bhusawal railway division